Alexander David McLees (9 November 1945- 14 June 2020). was a British architectural historian. He was a director in the Executive Committee of the Society of Architectural Historians of Great Britain (SAHGB) from 1998 to 2001. He wrote the Cadw guide for Castell Coch, a historic building in Cardiff.

Early life and education 
Alexander David McLees was born in St Andrews Fife, Scotland. He was the son of Alexander Gray McLees and Mary Adamson Syrmington. His mother was a school teacher and his father was a teacher and then deputy rector in Madras College in St Andrews. McLees studied at Madras, as did his older sister Margaret. McLees played on the college rugby team from 1962 to 1964. In 1964 he won the college's Coronation Medal for History.

In 1969 he was awarded a Master of Arts degree by the Courtauld Institute of Art in London, where his MA dissertation was on parish church architecture in Gloucestershire.

Work and research 
In 1972, McLees won the Reginald Taylor and Lord Fletcher essay prize from the British Archaeological Association. In 1978, he became a fellow of the Society of Antiquaries of Scotland.

McLees’ most notable work is perhaps the Cadw guide to Castell Coch, written in 1988. The guide has had two further editions: one published in 2005, and the other in 2018. In his research he gained access to previously unseen archive photography showing Castell Coch had commercial vineyards, something quite rare in Britain until the 1930s.

After this first collaboration with Cadw, McLees became an Inspector of Historical Buildings for the Welsh agency. McLees worked for Cadw again in 2013 in a campaign to preserve traditional Welsh terraced houses. He wrote a booklet about the historical value of such houses, with guidance on their care and preservation. McLees died in June 2020.

Bibliography 

 McLees, D. (1972) 'Henry Yevele: disposer of the King's Works of masonry' (JBAA, 3rd ser., XXXVI (1973), 52-72).
 McLees, D. (1988). Castell Coch. Cadw.
 Jeremy Knight, John B. Hilling, Jeremy Knight, Jeremy Knight, Jack Spurgeon, Keith Kissack, John R. Kenyon & David McLees (1993) Castles, Archaeological Journal, 150:sup1, 26-43, DOI: 10.1080/00665983.1993.11785942.

References 

1945 births
2020 deaths
British historians
People from St Andrews